Ishan Arya (born Irshad Ahsan) was an Indian cinematographer, and producer, best known as producer and cinematographer of Art cinema classic Garm Hava (1973). After working in theatre and advertising, he made his debut with Garm Hava directed by M. S. Sathyu. After that he worked largely in South Indian cinema, especially Telugu, though he work on two noted Hindi art films, Bazaar (1982) directed by Sagar Sarhadi and Anjuman (1986) directed by Muzaffar Ali. At the 23rd National Film Awards, he won the Best Cinematography Award for Telugu film, Mutyala Muggu (1975).

Personal life
He was born in the Ahsan family and is a nephew of Shaukat Kaifi and first cousin of Shabana Azmi. He was married to film, television and stage actress Sulbha Arya. His son Sameer Arya (married to Srishti Behl, the daughter of Ramesh Behl) is also a cinematographer, known for films like Koyla (1997), Koi... Mil Gaya (2003) and Shootout at Wadala (2013). His other son Sagar Arya is an actor and Voice over artist  and is married to Anwesha Bhattacharya, daughter of Rinki and film director Basu Bhattacharya.

Cinematographer Baba Azmi who is his first cousin, started his career assisting Arya in Telugu films in the 1970s, starting as light boy, he worked with Arya for 10–12 Telugu films.

Filmography

Producer
  Garm Hava (1973, Hindi)
 Rusthum Jodi (1980, Kannada)

Cinematographer
  Garm Hava (1973, Hindi)
 Mutyala Muggu (1975, Telugu)
 Khoon Pasina (1977, Hindi)
 Kakana Kote (1977, Kannada)
 Gorantha Deepam (1978, Telugu)
 Bazaar (1982, Hindi)
 Anjuman (1986, Hindi)
 Aaj Jhale Mukt Mi (1986, Marathi)
 Kahan Kahan Se Guzar Gaya (1986, Hindi)
 Nasihat (1986, Hindi)
 Mohre (1987, Hindi)
 Toorpu Velle Railu [1979,Telugu]

References

External links
 

Telugu film cinematographers
Film producers from Mumbai
Living people
Artists from Mumbai
Best Cinematography National Film Award winners
Year of birth missing (living people)
20th-century Indian photographers
Cinematographers from Maharashtra
Hindi film cinematographers
Marathi film cinematographers
Kannada film cinematographers